WIJD (1270 AM) is a radio station licensed to the community of Prichard, Alabama, United States, and serves the greater Mobile, Alabama, area. The station is owned by Wilkins Communications Network Inc. and the license is held by the Mobile Bay Corporation. It airs a Christian talk radio format.

History
This station signed on in the 1954 as WAIP, a daytime-only station with a country music format. In the early 1960s, under the ownership of Holt Broadcasting, it flipped to an easy listening format with the call letters WSIM (for "Wonderful Sound In Mobile"). The station briefly flipped to Top 40 then changed callsigns to WZAM and resumed a country format. In 1965, Kenneth S. Johnson bought the station and changed the call letters to WKSJ as a complement to and simulcast of country formatted WKSJ-FM. In the late 1970s the station was briefly a Music of Your Life station known as WLLF before switching back to country music.

In the late 1990s, the station flipped to a syndicated talk radio format as "Impact 1270". The station changed callsigns again to WIJD on October 1, 2003. This corresponded with a brief experiment as a simulcast of the contemporary Christian music format of WGCX in Pensacola, Florida, before returning to talk. In Summer 2004, the station returned to religious broadcasting full-time.

In April 2006, Satellite Radio Network (Michael Glinter, president) reached an agreement to sell WIJD to Wilkins Communications Network Inc. (Robert Wilkins, president) for a reported sale price of $450,000.
In 2012, Wilkins Radio started broadcasting on its FM translator (W239AP) at 95.7 in Mobile, Alabama. The programming on FM is a simulcast of WIJD AM 1270. The translation is operating as W250CB at 97.9 as of December 12, 2016.

References

External links

IJD
IJD
Talk radio stations in the United States
Radio stations established in 1954
1954 establishments in Alabama